Márgaro Gámiz (1905 – death unknown), nicknamed "Harry" and "Mazio", was a Cuban catcher in the Negro leagues in the 1920s.

A native of Havana, Cuba, Gámiz made his Negro leagues debut in 1926 with the Harrisburg Giants. He played for Harrisburg again the following season, then went on to play for the Philadelphia Tigers, Cuban Stars (East), and Baltimore Black Sox.

References

External links
 and Seamheads

1905 births
Date of birth missing
Year of death missing
Place of death missing
Baltimore Black Sox players
Cuban Stars (East) players
Harrisburg Giants players
Philadelphia Tigers players
Baseball catchers
Cuban expatriate baseball players in the United States
Baseball players from Havana